Radnaasümbereliin Gonchigdorj (born 1953) is Mongolian politician from the Mongolian Social Democratic Party and he has served twice as the Chairman of the legislature of Mongolia from 1990 to 1992 and from 1996 to 2000.

Born in Tsakhir, Arkhangai Province, he attended a school in Tariat, and matriculated at National University of Mongolia and earned science degree from Novosibirsk University of former Soviet Union. He worked university lecturer for 13 years. Between 1988 and 1990 he was director in a Mathematical Institute of Science Academy of Mongolia. Between September 1990 and July 1992 he was elected as the Chairman of the State Little Khural, and also served as the Vice President of Mongolia. The new constitution abolished the office of Vice President in 1992. He is the academician of Mongolian Science Academy and received honorary doctorate degree from Korean Incheon National University and National Academy of Governance of Mongolia.

He served as the Chairman of the State Great Khural from July 1996 to July 2000.

References

1953 births
Living people
Speakers of the State Great Khural
Mongolian Social Democratic Party politicians
Vice presidents of Mongolia
People from Arkhangai Province